Three ships of the United States Navy have been named USS Oregon and one is planned, in honor of the Oregon Territory or the 33rd state.
 The first  was a brig purchased in 1841 to support the U.S. Exploring Expedition and in commission until 1845.
 A never-launched monitor previously named  and Hercules was also called Oregon before she was broken up in the ways.
 The third  was a battleship that saw action in the Spanish–American War and was in commission from 1896 to 1919.
 The fourth  is a 

Confederate States Navy
 One ship of the Confederate States Navy also bore the name Oregon. See .

See also
 
 
 
 

United States Navy ship names